The following radio stations broadcast on FM frequency 101.7 MHz:

Argentina
 Del Sol in Roldán, Santa Fe
 Radio María in Deán Funes, Córdoba
 Vanguardia in Puerto Gaboto, Santa Fe
 LRM436 Vida in Las Toscas, Santa Fe

Australia 
 2UUS in Sydney, New South Wales
 2APH in Albury, New South Wales
 7HHO in Hobart, Tasmania
 ABC Classic FM in Mount Isa, Queensland
3MGB in Mallacoota, Victoria
 Radio National in Warrnambool, Victoria
 Sea FM (Australian radio network) in Burnie, Tasmania

Canada (Channel 269)
 CBGF-FM in Fox Harbour, Newfoundland and Labrador
 CBON-FM-5 in Elliot Lake, Ontario
 CBQ-FM in Thunder Bay, Ontario
 CBUE-FM in Hope, British Columbia
 CBXE-FM in Golden, British Columbia
 CFAE-FM in La Grande-1, Quebec
 CFJO-FM-1 in Lac-Megantic, Quebec
 CHLY-FM in Nanaimo, British Columbia
 CHRG-FM in Maria Reserve, Quebec
 CIAM-FM-5 in Weberville, Alberta
 CIDG-FM in Ottawa, Ontario
 CIVL-FM in Abbotsford, British Columbia
 CJME-1-FM in Swift Current, Saskatchewan
 CJSO-FM in Sorel, Quebec
 CKDH-FM in Amherst, Nova Scotia
 CKER-FM in Edmonton, Alberta
 CKHQ-FM in Oka, Quebec
 CIDG-FM in Ottawa, Ontario
 CKJC-FM in Sudbury, Ontario
 CKNX-FM in Wingham, Ontario
 VF2382 in Long Plain, Manitoba

China
 CNR The Voice of China in Zunyi

Germany
Lagardère Media in Germany (Radio Salu, Antenne AC, Das Hit Radio)

Mexico
 XEX-FM in Mexico City
 XHAR-FM in Pueblo Viejo, Veracruz
 XHCPN-FM in Piedras Negras, Coahuila
 XHCUT-FM in Cuautla, Morelos
 XHEMM-FM in Morelia, Michoacán
 XHESA-FM in Culiacán, Sinaloa
 XHHPR-FM in Hidalgo del Parral, Chihuahua
 XHHX-FM in Ciudad Obregón, Sonora
 XHOG-FM in Ojinaga, Chihuahua
 XHPARC-FM in Armería, Colima
 XHPR-FM in Veracruz, Veracruz
 XHROOC-FM in Chetumal, Quintana Roo
 XHTD-FM in Coatzacoalcos, Veracruz
 XHUNO-FM in Aguascalientes, Aguascalientes
 XHV-FM in Chihuahua, Chihuahua
 XHVIR-FM in Ciudad Victoria, Tamaulipas
 XHVV-FM in Tuxtla Gutiérrez, Chiapas
 XHZB-FM in Oaxaca, Oaxaca

Philippines
 DWST in San Fernando, La Union

United States (Channel 269)
 KALY-LP in Minneapolis, Minnesota
  in Silsbee, Texas
  in Storm Lake, Iowa
 KBFZ-LP in Garden City, Kansas
  in Fort Madison, Iowa
  in Hope, Arkansas
  in Carmel, California
 KCLS (FM) in Ely, Nevada
 KCTT-FM in Yellville, Arkansas
  in Thermopolis, Wyoming
 KEGE in Hamilton City, California
 KEKO (FM) in Hebronville, Texas
  in Gallatin, Missouri
 KHFG-LP in Helena, Montana
 KHGQ in Shungnak, Alaska
  in Lamar, Missouri
 KHTH in Santa Rosa, California
 KIHB-LP in Wichita, Kansas
 KJDM in Lindsborg, Kansas
 KJNI-LP in Lake Elsinore, California
 KJTR-LP in Rolla, Missouri
 KKIQ in Livermore, California
  in Sierra Vista, Arizona
 KKZU in Sayre, Oklahoma
  in Duluth, Minnesota
  in Redmond, Oregon
 KLTD in Temple, Texas
 KMWM in Alturas, California
 KMXM in Helena Valley Northeast, Montana
 KNTE in Bay City, Texas
  in Soldotna, Alaska
 KPUL in Winterset, Iowa
  in Springerville, Arizona
 KQEU-LP in Houston, Texas
  in Rio Rancho, New Mexico
  in Rochester, Minnesota
  in Medicine Lodge, Kansas
 KSAM-FM in Huntsville, Texas
  in Carpinteria, California
 KSKE-FM in Eagle, Colorado
 KSLK in Selawik, Alaska
  in Wrangell, Alaska
 KTFX-FM in Warner, Oklahoma
 KTJK in Hawley, Texas
  in Libby, Montana
 KUBY-LP in Dillingham, Alaska
  in Humnoke, Arkansas
 KVOE-FM in Emporia, Kansas
 KVOM-FM in Morrilton, Arkansas
 KWUL-FM in Elsberry, Missouri
 KXBB in Cienega Springs, Arizona
 KXCL in Rock Creek Park, Colorado
 KXKR in Catalina Foothills, Arizona
  in Big Bear Lake, California
 KXUT-LP in Logan, Utah
 KYDA in Azle, Texas
  in Wheatland, Wyoming
 KZXR-FM in Prosser, Washington
 KZZM in Mason, Texas
 WAVF in Hanahan, South Carolina
  in Lynchburg, Virginia
 WBEA in Southold, New York
  in Pittsfield, Massachusetts
  in Lynn, Massachusetts
  in Central City, Pennsylvania
  in Stowe, Vermont
  in Vero Beach, Florida
 WDEL-FM in Canton, New Jersey
 WDFC-LP in Greensboro, North Carolina
 WDVH-FM in Trenton, Florida
 WEHS-LP in Eupora, Mississippi
  in Moorefield, West Virginia
  in Greenville, Illinois
  in Pulaski, New York
 WGND-LP in Lafollette, Tennessee
 WGOG in Walhalla, South Carolina
  in Sauk Rapids, Minnesota
  in North Canton, Ohio
  in Lansing, Michigan
 WIKL in Elwood, Indiana
 WIOM-LP in Springfield, Massachusetts
  in Kentland, Indiana
 WJLE-FM in Smithville, Tennessee
 WJSQ in Athens, Tennessee
 WKOM in Columbia, Tennessee
 WKVV in Searsport, Maine
  in Kilmarnock, Virginia
  in Monticello, Kentucky
 WKYZ in Key Colony Beach, Florida
  in Fort Wayne, Indiana
  in Geneva, New York
  in Attica, New York
  in Franklin, Virginia
  in Johnson City, New York
 WMGL in Ravenel, South Carolina
 WMRH-LP in Linwood, New Jersey
  in Muskegon Heights, Michigan
  in Linesville, Pennsylvania
  in Stevenson, Alabama
 WNKO in Newark, Ohio
  in Hudson Falls, New York
  in Savannah, Tennessee
  in Coleman, Michigan
 WQRR in Reform, Alabama
  in Albany, Georgia
 WRAD-FM in Radford, Virginia
  in Warner Robins, Georgia
  in Dixon, Illinois
 WRFH-LP in Hillsdale, Michigan
 WRJF-LP in Menomonie, Wisconsin
 WSOV-LP in Millheim, Pennsylvania
  in Thomson, Georgia
 WTID in Graceville, Florida
  in Mckinnon, Tennessee
  in Robinson, Illinois
 WVKY in Shelbyville, Kentucky
 WWJP-LP in Rice Lake, Wisconsin
 WXTH-LP in Richwood, West Virginia
 WXZY-LP in Kane, Pennsylvania
 WYAP-LP in Clay, West Virginia
  in Gluckstadt, Mississippi
  in Mount Vernon, Georgia
  in Ocean View, Delaware
 WZYQ in Mound Bayou, Mississippi

Lists of radio stations by frequency